Lake Worth Independent School District is a public school district based in Lake Worth, Texas, United States.

In addition to Lake Worth, the district serves small portions of Fort Worth and Sansom Park.

In 2009, the school district was rated "academically acceptable" by the Texas Education Agency.

Schools
Lake Worth ISD has six schools - three in Lake Worth and three in Fort Worth.

Lake Worth High School (Lake Worth; grades 9-12)
Lucyle Collins Middle (Fort Worth; grades 6-8)
N.A. Howry STEAM Academy (Lake Worth; grades 1-5)
Effie Morris Early Learning Academy  (Lake Worth; grades PK-K)
Marilyn Janice Miller Language Academy  (Fort Worth; grades 1-5)
Marine Creek Leadership Academy (Fort Worth; grades 1-5)

History

Rosen Heights Independent School District (1916-1959)
On May 6, 1916, local citizens voted 16-1 to incorporate Rosen Heights Independent School District. Rosen Heights Independent School was founded in 1923 with 16 pupils in a vacant store donated by a Mr. Hodgkins. In 1936, the district acquired land in Lake Worth to build a school building. The first reference to the building as Lake Worth School was on May 8, 1940. After a fire burned down the original school building, in the fall of 1943, school began in a yet-unfinished new school building.

In 1940, the City of Fort Worth, the Civil Aeronautics Administration, and Consolidated Aircraft began plans to build an airfield and aircraft assembly plant in the Lake Worth vicinity. The next year, the board of trustees asked the Texas State Legislature for assistance in providing additional room and equipment for the anticipated growth the airfield would bring.

The Rosen Heights Independent School District school board resisted an effort by the City of Fort Worth to annex the school district in 1946.

Starting in February 1948, multiple attempts were made to pass a municipal bond election for $50,000 to build new classrooms, including a 170-183 loss in August 1949. The bond eventually passed in August 1950; at the time, Rosen Heights' total taxable value was $2,731,164.

During 1948-1950, the school board and superintendent sent multiple letters to Carswell Air Force Base, congressmen, and the War Department, requesting that the base reroute their flight plans as to not fly over the Lake Worth school building. In November 1954, an attorney was named to address the issue of the planes flying over the school.

During the 1950s, the district made plans for a new high school building and multiple elementary school buildings. On June 29, 1959, a school board decision changed the legal name of the school district from Rosen Heights Independent School District to Lake Worth Independent School district, effective September 1 of that year.

Lake Worth Independent School District (1959-today)

By the 1960s, noise from air traffic at Carswell Air Force Base caused the district's schools to lose 10% of teaching time each day. To mitigate this problem, Lake Worth Junior High School was built underground; this 1964 construction project included 18 rooms at a cost of $495,000.

In August 1970, voting for school board members was changed from at-large to election by place. Each year, two or three of the seven board member positions are up for election.

Students

Academics

Local region and statewide averages on standardized tests typically exceed the average scores of students in Lake Worth.  In 2015-2016 State of Texas Assessments of Academic Readiness (STAAR) results, 65% of students in Lake Worth ISD met Level II Satisfactory standards, compared with 77% in Region 11 and 75% in the state of Texas. The average SAT score of the class of 2015 was 1293, and the average ACT score was 17.1.

Demographics
In the 2015-2016 school year, the school district had a total of 3,296 students, ranging from early childhood education and prekindergarten through grade 12. The class of 2015 included 155 graduates; the annual drop-out rate across grades 9-12 was less than 0.5%.

As of the 2015-2016 school year, the ethnic distribution of the school district was 58.5% Hispanic, 24.2% White, 12.4% African American, 1.1% Asian, 0.5% American Indian, 0.2% Pacific Islander, and 3.0% from two or more races. Economically disadvantaged students made up 79.5% of the student body.

References

External links
Lake Worth ISD

School districts in Tarrant County, Texas
School districts in Fort Worth, Texas
School districts established in 1916
1916 establishments in Texas